Chaudoin may refer to:

Chaudoin Township, Perkins County, South Dakota, township in the United States
Mount Chaudoin, mountain in Victoria Land, Antarctica